is a Japanese footballer who plays for Shonan Bellmare.

Early life
His father is a former football player who played for Mazda SC and Japan U-20 national team.

National team career
In August 2007, Yamada was elected Japan U-17 national team for 2007 U-17 World Cup. He wore the number 10 shirt for Japan and played full time in all 3 matches.

Yamada made his senior national team debut on 27 May 2009, in a friendly match against Chile at Nagai Stadium in Osaka and assisted on a goal by Keisuke Honda.

Frequent injuries
Yamada has suffered from frequent injuries that kept him out for several matches.

On 6 January 2010 in 2011 AFC Asian Cup qualification between Yemen and Japan, Yamada was forced to go out after 21 minutes after his right leg was exposed to a violent break after the intervention of the Yemeni defender Ahmed Sadeq to miss the matches for a period of 3 months.

On 20 March 2012, Yamada was exposed to yet another injury with a break in the anterior cruciate ligament in a match between Urawa Reds and Vegalta Sendai in the 2012 J. League Cup. Urawa Reds announced his absence from the matches for a period of 6 months. And deprived of participation in the 2012 Summer Olympics with Japan.

Career statistics

Club
Updated to 20 February 2019.

International

Honours

Japan
AFC U-17 Championship: 2006
Kirin Cup: 2009

References

External links
 Profile at Shonan Bellmare 
 Profile at Urawa Red Diamonds 
 
 
Japan National Football Team Database

 Naoki Yamada – Yahoo! Japan Sports 

1990 births
Living people
Association football people from Saitama Prefecture
Japanese footballers
Japan youth international footballers
Japan international footballers
J1 League players
J2 League players
Urawa Red Diamonds players
Shonan Bellmare players
Sportspeople from Hiroshima
Association football midfielders